{{DISPLAYTITLE:C11H14O3}}
The molecular formula C11H14O3 (molar mass: 194.22 g/mol) may refer to:

 Butylparaben
 tert-Butyl peroxybenzoate
 Zingerone (also called vanillylacetone)

Molecular formulas